A Union Council is a body of elected or appointed representatives who represent students who are members of a students' union. Union Council's often have the power to hold the Union's Officers to account and to create new Union policies.  The Council is usually not responsible for implementing Union policy.  A policy passed by such a body usually has less authority than one passed by a general meeting of students or a referendum of all students in the Union.

See also 
 Union council (disambiguation)

Students' unions